Baile na hAbhann, anglicised as  Ballynahown, is a Gaeltacht village about  west of Galway, Ireland, on the R336 regional road between Indreabhán and Casla. The name means "town of the river". The village is in the townland of Baile na hAbhann Theas (Ballynahown South).

The Irish-language television channel TG4 has its headquarters here. The village is served by Bus Éireann route 424 from Galway City.

References 

Baile na hAbhann Theas
Gaeltacht places in County Galway
Gaeltacht towns and villages